The Azteca-class patrol vessel are a class of patrol vessels in service with the Mexican Navy. They were designed and built by the British companies T.T. Boat Designs Ltd; Ailsa Shipbuilding Co. Ltd., Scott & Sons, Bowling; Lamont & Co. Ltd. and Vera Cruz and Salina Cruz Shipyards for the Mexican Navy from 1976  to 1980. They are multi-role patrol craft with good nautical characteristics. Original units were named with pre-Hispanic tribal names.

Design and description
The ships are propelled by two shafts driven by two Ruston Paxman Ventura diesels creating . The ships are armed with one Bofors 40 mm gun, one 20 mm Oerlikon GAM-B01 cannon and two machine guns. The Azteca class has a complement of 24.

Ships

References

Citations

Sources
 
 
 

Patrol vessels of the Mexican Navy
Patrol boat classes